Crassulacean acid metabolism, also known as CAM photosynthesis, is a carbon fixation pathway that evolved in some plants as an adaptation to arid conditions that allows a plant to photosynthesize during the day, but only exchange gases at night. In a plant using full CAM, the stomata in the leaves remain shut during the day to reduce evapotranspiration, but they open at night to collect carbon dioxide and allow it to diffuse into the mesophyll cells. The pre-collected  is concentrated around the enzyme RuBisCO, increasing photosynthetic efficiency. This mechanism of acid metabolism was first discovered in plants of the family Crassulaceae.

Historical background
Observations relating to CAM were first made by de Saussure in 1804 in his Recherches Chimiques sur la Végétation. Benjamin Heyne in 1812 noted that Bryophyllum leaves in India were acidic in the morning and tasteless by afternoon. These observations were studied further and refined by Aubert, E. in 1892 in his Recherches physiologiques sur les plantes grasses and expounded upon by Richards, H. M. 1915 in Acidity and Gas Interchange in Cacti, Carnegie Institution. The term CAM may have been coined by Ranson and Thomas in 1940, but they were not the first to discover this cycle. It was observed by the botanists Ranson and Thomas, in the succulent family Crassulaceae (which includes jade plants and Sedum). The name "Crassulacean acid metabolism" refers to acid metabolism in Crassulaceae, and not the metabolism of "crassulacean acid"; there is no chemical by that name.

Overview: a two-part cycle

CAM is an adaptation for increased efficiency in the use of water, and so is typically found in plants growing in arid conditions. (CAM is found in over 99% of the known 1700 species of Cactaceae and in nearly all of the cactii producing edible fruits.)

During the night
During the night, a plant employing CAM has its stomata open, allowing  to enter and be fixed as organic acids by a PEP reaction similar to the  pathway. The resulting organic acids are stored in vacuoles for later use, as the Calvin cycle cannot operate without ATP and NADPH, products of light-dependent reactions that do not take place at night.

During the day
During the day, the stomata close to conserve water, and the -storing organic acids are released from the vacuoles of the mesophyll cells.

Benefits
The most important benefit of CAM to the plant is the ability to leave most leaf stomata closed during the day. Plants employing CAM are most common in arid environments, where water is scarce. Being able to keep stomata closed during the hottest and driest part of the day reduces the loss of water through evapotranspiration, allowing such plants to grow in environments that would otherwise be far too dry. Plants using only  carbon fixation, for example, lose 97% of the water they take up through the roots to transpiration - a high cost avoided by plants able to employ CAM.

Comparison with  metabolism 

The  pathway bears resemblance to CAM; both act to concentrate  around RuBisCO, thereby increasing its efficiency. Due to the inactivity required by the CAM mechanism,  carbon fixation has a greater efficiency in terms of PGA synthesis.

There are some /CAM intermediate species, such as Peperomia camptotricha, Portulaca oleracea, and Portulaca grandiflora. The two pathways of photosynthesis can occur in the same leaves but not in the same cells, and the two pathways cannot couple and can only occur side by side

Biochemistry 

At low temperatures (frequently at night), plants using CAM open their stomata,  molecules diffuse into the spongy mesophyll's intracellular spaces and then into the cytoplasm. Here, they can meet phosphoenolpyruvate (PEP), which is a phosphorylated triose. During this time, the plants are synthesizing a protein called PEP carboxylase kinase (PEP-C kinase), whose expression can be inhibited by high temperatures (frequently at daylight) and the presence of malate. PEP-C kinase phosphorylates its target enzyme PEP carboxylase (PEP-C). Phosphorylation dramatically enhances the enzyme's capability to catalyze the formation of oxaloacetate, which can be subsequently transformed into malate by NAD+ malate dehydrogenase. Malate is then transported via malate shuttles into the vacuole, where it is converted into the storage form malic acid. In contrast to PEP-C kinase, PEP-C is synthesized all the time but almost inhibited at daylight either by dephosphorylation via PEP-C phosphatase or directly by binding malate. The latter is not possible at low temperatures, since malate is efficiently transported into the vacuole, whereas PEP-C kinase readily inverts dephosphorylation.

In daylight, plants using CAM close their guard cells and discharge malate that is subsequently transported into chloroplasts. There, depending on plant species, it is cleaved into pyruvate and  either by malic enzyme or by PEP carboxykinase.  is then introduced into the Calvin cycle, a coupled and self-recovering enzyme system, which is used to build branched carbohydrates. The by-product pyruvate can be further degraded in the mitochondrial citric acid cycle, thereby providing additional  molecules for the Calvin Cycle. Pyruvate can also be used to recover PEP via pyruvate phosphate dikinase, a high-energy step, which requires ATP and an additional phosphate. During the following cool night, PEP is finally exported into the cytoplasm, where it is involved in fixing carbon dioxide via malate.

Use by plants

Plants use CAM to different degrees. Some are "obligate CAM plants", i.e. they use only CAM in photosynthesis, although they vary in the amount of  they are able to store as organic acids; they are sometimes divided into "strong CAM" and "weak CAM" plants on this basis. Another group of plants employ "CAM-cycling", in which their stomata do not open at night; the plants instead recycle  produced by respiration as well as storing some  during the day.

Plants showing inducible CAM and CAM-cycling are typically found in conditions where periods of water shortage alternate with periods when water is freely available. Periodic drought – a feature of semi-arid regions – is one cause of water shortage. Plants which grow on trees or rocks (as epiphytes or lithophytes) also experience variations in water availability. Salinity, high light levels and nutrient availability are other factors which have been shown to induce CAM.

Since CAM is an adaptation to arid conditions, plants using CAM often display other xerophytic characters, such as thick, reduced leaves with a low surface-area-to-volume ratio; thick cuticle; and stomata sunken into pits. Some shed their leaves during the dry season; others (the succulents)  store water in vacuoles. CAM also causes taste differences: plants may have an increasingly sour taste during the night yet become sweeter-tasting during the day. This is due to malic acid being stored in the vacuoles of the plants' cells during the night and then being used up during the day.

Aquatic CAM
CAM photosynthesis is also found in aquatic species in at least 4 genera, including: Isoetes, Crassula, Littorella, Sagittaria, and possibly Vallisneria, being found in a variety of species e.g. Isoetes howellii, Crassula aquatica.

These plants follow the same nocturnal acid accumulation and daytime deacidification as terrestrial CAM species.

Aquatic CAM plants capture carbon at night when it is abundant due to a lack of competition from other photosynthetic organisms. This also results in lowered photorespiration due to less photosynthetically generated oxygen.

However, in the winter months CAM still has a significant role.

Ecological and taxonomic distribution of CAM-using plants
The majority of plants possessing CAM are either epiphytes (e.g., orchids, bromeliads) or succulent xerophytes (e.g., cacti, cactoid Euphorbias), but CAM is also found in hemiepiphytes (e.g., Clusia); lithophytes (e.g., Sedum, Sempervivum); terrestrial bromeliads; wetland plants (e.g., Isoetes, Crassula (Tillaea), Lobelia); and in one halophyte, Mesembryanthemum crystallinum; one non-succulent terrestrial plant, (Dodonaea viscosa) and one mangrove associate (Sesuvium portulacastrum).

The only trees that can do CAM are in the genus Clusia; species of which are found across Central America, South America and the Caribbean. In Clusia, CAM is found in species that inhabit hotter, drier ecological niches, whereas species living in cooler montane forests tend to be . This allows these trees to benefit from the elevated growth rates of  photosynthesis, when water is plentiful, and the drought tolerant nature of CAM, when the dry season occurs. 

Plants which are able to switch between different methods of carbon fixation include Portulacaria afra, better known as Dwarf Jade Plant, which normally uses C3 fixation but can use CAM if it is drought-stressed, and Portulaca oleracea, better known as Purslane, which normally uses  fixation but is also able to switch to CAM when drought-stressed.

CAM has evolved convergently many times. It occurs in 16,000 species (about 7% of plants), belonging to over 300 genera and around 40 families, but this is thought to be a considerable underestimate. The great majority of plants using CAM are angiosperms (flowering plants) but it is found in ferns, Gnetopsida and in quillworts (relatives of club mosses). Interpretation of the first quillwort genome in 2021 (I. taiwanensis) suggested that its use of CAM was another example of convergent evolution. 

The following list summarizes the taxonomic distribution of plants with CAM:

See also

C2 photosynthesis
C3 carbon fixation
C4 carbon fixation

RuBisCO

References

External links

Khan Academy, video lecture

Photosynthesis
Plant metabolism